The 2013–14 Highland Football League  kicked off on 3 August 2013 with the final round of fixtures being played on or before 10 May 2014. The defending champions were Cove Rangers. Brora Rangers were crowned champions for the first time in their history, while Fort William finished last. Brora set new Highland League records by achieving the highest points total and largest margin of victory in the league's history, and their win rate of 31 out of 34 (91.2%) was the highest since Clachnacuddin achieved 11 wins out of 12 (91.7%) in the 1903–04 season. In conceding just 16 goals during the season, Brora also beat Peterhead's previous postwar record of 19 conceded in the 1998–99 season, and became the first club ever to achieve a positive goal difference in excess of 100.

This was the first season in which the Highland League was integrated into the senior pyramid system at level 5, however it was confirmed as per the terms of restructuring that play-offs for a place in the SPFL would commence from 2014–15 onwards.

League table

Results

References

Highland Football League seasons
5
Scottish